The 138th Fighter Wing (138 FW) is a unit of the Oklahoma Air National Guard, stationed at the Tulsa Air National Guard Base at Tulsa International Airport in Tulsa, Oklahoma. If activated to federal service as a United States Air Force unit, the 138 FW is gained by the Air Combat Command (ACC).

Overview
The 138th Fighter Wing (138 FW) is an Oklahoma Air National Guard unit stationed at Tulsa Air National Guard Base at Tulsa International Airport in Tulsa, Oklahoma.

As an Air National Guard unit, the 138 FW is part of the Air Reserve Component (ARC) of the U.S. Air Force and is operationally gained by the Air Combat Command.  The wing currently flies the Block 42 version of the F-16C and F-16D Fighting Falcon.

The federal mission of the 138 FW is to maintain combat forces ready for mobilization, deployment, and employment as needed to support national security objectives.

The state mission of the 138 FW is to support the Governor of Oklahoma with units organized, equipped, and trained in the protection of life and property, and the preservation of peace, order, and public safety.

Units
The 138th Fighter Wing consists of the following units:
 138th Operations Group
 125th Fighter Squadron
 138th Maintenance Group
 138th Mission Support Group
 138th Medical Group
 219th Engineering Installation Squadron

History
In 1957, the Oklahoma Air National Guard was given a fighter-interceptor mission in the Air Defense Command (ADC), and on 1 August, the 125th Fighter-Bomber Squadron was authorized to expand to a group level.  The 138th Fighter-Interceptor Group was authorized and extended federal recognition by the National Guard Bureau. The 125th Fighter-Interceptor Squadron becoming the group's flying unit. Other support squadrons assigned into the group were the 138th Headquarters, 138th Material Squadron (Maintenance), 138th Combat Support Squadron, and the 138th USAF Dispensary.

With the Fighter-Interceptor mission assignment, the 125th also assumed ADC runway alert program on full 24-hour basis—with armed jet fighters ready to "scramble" at a moment's notice. This event brought the group into the daily combat operational program of the USAF, placing us on "the end of the runway" alongside regular USAF-Air Defense Fighter Squadrons. The obsolescent F-80-day fighters were upgraded to the all-weather/day/night F-86D Sabre Interceptor by the end of the year. In June 1959 the squadron traded their F-86Ds for the upgraded F-86L Sabre Interceptor with uprated afterburning engines and new electronics.

Air Transport mission
In January 1960, the 138th FIS was reassigned to the Military Air Transport Service (MATS), trading in its Sabre interceptors for 4-engined C-97 Stratofreighter transports. With air transportation recognized as a critical wartime need, the unit was re-designated the 138th Air Transport Wing (Heavy) with the 125th Air Transport Squadron. During the 1961 Berlin Crisis, both the Group and squadron were federalized on 1 October 1961. From Tulsa, the 125th ATS augmented MATS airlift capability worldwide in support of the Air Force's needs. It returned again to Oklahoma state control on 31 August 1962. Throughout the 1960s, the 125th flew long-distance transport missions in support of Air Force requirements, frequently sending aircraft to the Caribbean, Europe, Australia, Hawaii, Japan, the Philippines, and during the Vietnam War, to both South Vietnam, Okinawa and Thailand.  The C-97s were retired in 1968 and the unit was transferred to Military Airlift Command (MAC), being re-equipped with C-124C Globemaster II heavy transports.  The Group continued to fly long-distance intercontinental airlift flights until the Globemasters were retired at the end of 1972.

Tactical Fighter mission

With the retirement of the Globemasters, the 138th was transferred to Tactical Air Command on 25 January 1973, with the 125th Tactical Fighter Squadron being re-equipped with veteran F-100D/F Super Sabre tactical fighter bombers that were returning from the Vietnam War.  The Super Sabre was dedicated fighter-bomber, with no concession being made to a secondary air-superiority role and the squadron trained in using the fighter for ground support. Beginning in 1975, the 125th began a NATO commitment, with squadron aircraft and personnel deploying to the United States Air Forces in Europe (USAFE) for Autumn Forge/Cold Fire/Reforger exercises.

In 1978, the F-100s were being retired, and they were replaced with A-7D Corsair II subsonic tactical close air support aircraft from the 23d Tactical Fighter Wing, England AFB, Louisiana along with the 354th Tactical Fighter Wing, Myrtle Beach AFB, South Carolina which were converting to the A-10 Thunderbolt II.  The aircraft had excellent accuracy with the aid of an automatic electronic navigation and weapons delivery system. Although designed primarily as a ground attack aircraft, it also had limited air-to-air combat capability.   In 1980, the 125th received the new twin-seat A-7K trainer and also received the Low Altitude Night Attack modification to the A-7D.

Modern era

Early in the 1990s with the declared end of the Cold War and the continued decline in military budgets, the Air Force restructured to meet changes in strategic requirements, decreasing personnel, and a smaller infrastructure. The 138th adopted the new USAF "Objective Organization" in early 1992, with the word "tactical" being eliminated from its designation and becoming the 138th Fighter Group. Tactical Air Command was inactivated on 1 June, being replaced by the new Air Combat Command (ACC).

The 125th Fighter Squadron flew A-7Ds until 1993 when it began to receive Block 42 F-16C/D Fighting Falcons, replacing the venerable A-7D in the attack roles. Most of these aircraft came from the 51st Fighter Wing, Osan Air Base, South Korea and the 363d Fighter Wing, Shaw AFB, South Carolina, which were trading in Block 42s for more advanced F-16s.  The 125th, although an Air National Guard unit, which were mostly tasked with air defense of US mainland, was tasked with a conventional attack mission. This was already the case in the A-7D and even in the F-100 era. The squadron was one of the first Air National Guard units to be equipped with the Low Altitude Navigation and Targeting Infrared for Night, or LANTIRN system to be able to illuminate their own ground targets. At the time of conversion this unit was one of the most advanced within the Air National Guard.

In mid-1996, the Air Force, in response to budget cuts, and changing world situations, began experimenting with Air Expeditionary organizations. The Air Expeditionary Force (AEF) concept was developed that would mix Active Duty Regular Air Force, Air Force Reserve, and Air National Guard elements into a combined force. Instead of entire permanent units deploying as "Provisional" as in the 1991 Gulf War, Expeditionary units are composed of "aviation packages" from several wings, including the active duty Air Force, the Air Force Reserve Command, and the Air National Guard, would be married together to carry out the assigned deployment rotation.

In October 1996, the 125th Expeditionary Fighter Squadron (125 EFS) was first formed from 138th FW personnel and aircraft and deployed to Incirlik Air Base, Turkey, to join with other active-duty and national guard squadrons as part of Operation Northern Watch. This mission was part of a multi-unit Air National Guard "rainbow" deployment involving the Air National Guard block 42 F-16 squadrons. Each squadron provided eight aircraft to a total of 24 aircraft deployed.  The 125th EFS returned to Tulsa and was inactivated on 7 January 1997.   Further Northern Watch activations of the 125th EFS and subsequent deployments to Incirlik AB occurred in the spring of 1998 and fall of 2001.

The 125th Expeditionary Fighter Squadron has also been deployed to Al Jaber Air Base, Kuwait for Operation Southern Watch in 2001, and to Balad Air Base, Iraq in 2007 and 2008 as part of Operation Iraqi Freedom.  In 2011, the 125th EFS deployed to Al Assad, Iraq for the final time to support Operation New Dawn, when more than 200 members deployed there to provide air support to the final drawdown of U.S. and coalition forces, being able to respond quickly to any needs troops in combat may have as they left the country.  In 2013, the 125th EFS deployed to Kandahar AB as part of Operation Enduring Freedom.  In 2018 the squadron returned to Bagram AB, Afghanistan in support of Operation Freedom's Sentinel and Operation Resolute Support.

Lineage
 Designated: 138th Fighter-Interceptor Group, and allotted to the Oklahoma ANG, in 1957
 Extended federal recognition on 1 August 1957
 Re-designated: 138th Air Transport Group, 15 January 1960
 Re-designated: 138th Military Airlift Group, 8 January 1966
 Re-designated: 138th Tactical Fighter Group, 25 January 1973
 Re-designated: 138th Fighter Group, 15 March 1992
 Status changed from Group to Wing, 1 October 1995
 Re-designated: 138th Fighter Wing, 1 October 1995

Assignments
 Oklahoma Air National Guard, 1 August 1957 – present
 Gained by: Central Air Defense Force, Air Defense Command
 Gained by: Oklahoma City Air Defense Sector, Air Defense Command, 1 January 1960
 Gained by: Western Transport Air Force, (WESTAF), Military Air Transport Service, 15 January 1960
 Gained by: Twenty-Second Air Force, Military Airlift Command, 8 January 1966 
 Gained by: Tactical Air Command, 25 January 1973
 Gained by: Air Combat Command, 1 June 1992-Present

Components
 138th Operations Group, 1 October 1995 – present
 125th Fighter-Interceptor (later Air Transport, Military Airlift, Tactical Fighter, Fighter) Squadron, 1 August 1957 – present

Stations
 Tulsa Municipal Airport, Oklahoma, 1 August 1957 
 Tulsa International Airport, 28 August 1963 
 Designated: Tulsa Air National Guard Base, 1991–present

Aircraft

 F-86D Sabre Interceptor, 1957–1959
 F-86L Sabre Interceptor, 1959–1960
 C-97G Stratofreighter, 1960–1968
 C-124C Globemaster II, 1968–1973
 F-100D/F Super Sabre, 1973–1978
 A-7D/K Corsair II, 1978–1993
 Block 42 F-16C/D Fighting Falcon, 1993–present

Decorations
  Air Force Outstanding Unit Award

See also

References

 History of the Oklahoma Air National Guard
 125th Fighter Squadron history
 F-16.net 125th Fighter Squadron
 Rogers, B. (2006). United States Air Force Unit Designations Since 1978. 
  Cornett, Lloyd H. and Johnson, Mildred W., A Handbook of Aerospace Defense Organization  1946–1980, Office of History, Aerospace Defense Center, Peterson AFB, CO (1980).

 Attribution

External links

Wings of the United States Air National Guard
Military units and formations in Oklahoma
138